Armitage railway station was a station on the Trent Valley Line, part of what is now known as the West Coast Main Line, and served the village of Armitage, Staffordshire, England.

History

The station was opened in 1847 by the London and North Western Railway, and was absorbed by the London Midland and Scottish Railway during the Grouping of 1923. The station passed on to the London Midland Region of British Railways on nationalisation in 1948. It was closed by the British Transport Commission in 1960.

The site today 

The line through the station, which was located between the present stations at Lichfield and Rugeley is still part of the now electrified  WCML.

References 

 
 
 Station on navigable O.S. map

External links

Disused railway stations in Staffordshire
Former London and North Western Railway stations
Railway stations in Great Britain opened in 1847
Railway stations in Great Britain closed in 1960
1847 establishments in England
John William Livock buildings